This is a chronological list of spaceflights to the International Space Station (ISS), including long-term ISS crew, short term visitors, and mixed human/cargo missions. Uncrewed visiting spacecraft are excluded (see Uncrewed spaceflights to the International Space Station for details). ISS crew members are listed in bold. "Time docked" refers to the spacecraft and does not always correspond to the crew.

, 244 people from 19 countries had visited the space station, many of them multiple times. The United States sent 153 people, Russia sent 50, nine were Japanese, eight were Canadian, five were Italian, four were French, three were German, and there were one each from Belgium, Brazil, Denmark, Great Britain, Kazakhstan, Malaysia, the Netherlands, South Africa, South Korea, Spain, Sweden and the United Arab Emirates.

U.S. Space Shuttle missions were capable of carrying more humans and cargo than the Russian Soyuz spacecraft, resulting in more U.S. short-term human visits until the Space Shuttle program was discontinued in 2011. Between 2011 and 2020, Soyuz was the sole means of human transport to the ISS, delivering mostly long-term crew. Russian cargo deliveries have been exclusively carried out by the uncrewed missions of Progress spacecraft, requiring fewer human spaceflights.

To avoid confusion, this list includes Soyuz MS-22, which was launched crewed but landed uncrewed, however it does not include Soyuz MS-23, which was launched uncrewed, but landed crewed which is listed at Uncrewed spaceflights to the International Space Station.

Continued international collaboration on ISS missions has been thrown into doubt by the 2022 Russian invasion of Ukraine and related sanctions on Russia.

Completed

Current

Future

Failed

Notes

See also
 Assembly of the International Space Station
 International Space Station
 List of commanders of the ISS
 List of human spaceflights to Mir
 List of International Space Station crew
 List of International Space Station spacewalks
 List of International Space Station visitors
 List of Progress flights
 List of spaceflights to the International Space Station
 Mir
 Uncrewed spaceflights to the International Space Station

References

External links
 NASA ISS Consolidated Launch Manifest
 ESA ISS Consolidated Launch Manifest
 Astronauts in Space right now

ISS
International Space Station human spaceflights